Yin Pak was a Chinese actress and producer from Hong Kong. She was credited with over 300 films and had a star at Avenue of Stars in Hong Kong.

Early life 
In 1920, Pak was born as Chan Yuk Ping in Guangzhou, China.

Career 
In 1936, Pak began her acting career in Guangzhou, China. In 1937, Pak became a  Hong Kong actress and debuted in The Magnificent Country, a 1937 war film directed by Chan Tin. In 1952, Pak co-founded Union Film Enterprise. Pak received the First Class Individual Achievement Award from People's Republic of China for her role in Spring (1953), a historical drama directed by Lee Sun-fung. In 1954, Pak founded Shan Luen Motion Picture Company, and it produced Madam Yun (1954) as the first film in the same year and Pak played the role of Madam Yun. Pak is known as the diva of Cantonese cinema of the 1950s and ‘60s. In 1964, Pak retired from acting. Pak is credited with over 300 films. Pak is notable for her role as a devoted wife in her films.

Filmography

Films 
This is a partial list of films.
 1937 The Magnificent Country 
 1938 Shanghai Under Fire - 
 1953 Spring - Chow Wai 
 1954 Madam Yun - Madam Yun 
 1955 Cold Nights - Tsang Shu Sang.
 1957 Thunderstorm -Lui Shi-ping 
 1958 Marriage on the Rocks - Chan Sin-Man
 1960 The Orphan - Teacher
 1960 Madam Wan
 1960 The Great Devotion - Lee Yuk-Mei
 1964 A Mad Woman

Awards 
 First Class Individual Achievement Award. For her role in Spring (1953). Presented by the Cultural Ministry of the People's Republic of China.
 Star. Avenue of Stars. Tsim Sha Tsui waterfront in Hong Kong.

Personal life 
On May 6, 1987, Pak died.

See also 
 Man-lei Wong

References

External links 
 Yin Pak at imdb.com
 Pak Yin at hkcinemagic.com
 Pak Yin at hkmdb.com
 Pak Yin at timeout.com

1920 births
1987 deaths
Hong Kong film actresses
Hong Kong film producers
People from Guangzhou
Actresses from Guangzhou
Chinese emigrants to British Hong Kong